James Pierpont may refer to:

 James Pierpont (minister) (1659–1714), US Congregationalist minister and founder of Yale University
 James Pierpont (mathematician) (1866–1938), American mathematician

See also 
 James Lord Pierpont (1822–1893), American songwriter and composer